Saue Jalgpalliklubi is an Estonian football club based in Saue. Founded in 1998, they currently play in the III liiga, the fourth tier of Estonian football.

Players

Current squad
 ''As of 16 June 2017.

Statistics

League and Cup

References

Saue Parish
Football clubs in Estonia
Association football clubs established in 1998